Frederic Aldin Hall (1854–1925) served as chancellor of Washington University in St. Louis from 1913 until 1923.

Early years
Hall was born in Brunswick, Maine in 1854. He graduated from Drury College in Springfield, Missouri.

Washington University
Hall joined Washington University in 1901 as Professor of Greek. He became dean of the College in 1913 and a year later was named acting chancellor when Chancellor Houston was named U.S. Secretary of Agriculture. During his tenure, Hall established the School of Graduate Studies and the School of Commerce and Finance.

External links
Washington University in St. Louis
Biographical entry at Washington University in St. Louis

1854 births
Chancellors of Washington University in St. Louis
1925 deaths
People from Brunswick, Maine
Drury University alumni
Washington University in St. Louis faculty